Bill Malley is an American production designer and art director. He was nominated for an Academy Award in the category Best Art Direction for the film The Exorcist.

Selected filmography
 The Exorcist (1973)

References

External links

American production designers
American art directors
Year of birth missing (living people)
Living people